Pura Penataran Sasih is a Hindu temple in Pejeng village, Bali. 
It was founded, according to a modern chronogram displayed at the entrance, in 1266 AD,
and served as the state temple of the Pejeng Kingdom, 1293 - 1343 AD.

Significant features of the temple include:
 A split-gate entrance.
 A modern chronogram in front of the entrance.
 A collection of 10th-12th century Hindu sculptures that were brought here from other parts of the island.
 A very tall, stone Seat of Ganesh in the middle of the main courtyard.
 The celebrated Moon of Pejeng, a very early and revered colossal bronze drum.

References 

Hindu temples in Indonesia
1266 establishments in Asia
Gianyar Regency